St Brides may refer to:

Places

United Kingdom
 St Brides, Pembrokeshire, South Wales, United Kingdom
 St Brides Bay
 St Brides, Newport, South Wales, United Kingdom
 St. Brides-super-Ely (Peterston-super-Ely), Vale of Glamorgan, South Wales, United Kingdom
 St Brides Major, Vale of Glamorgan, Wales, United Kingdom
 St Brides Major (community), Vale of Glamorgan, Wales, United Kingdom
 St. Brides Netherwent, Monmouthshire, South East Wales, United Kingdom

Canada
 St. Bride's, Newfoundland and Labrador, Canada

See also
 St Bride's Church (disambiguation)
 St Bride's, former Irish spiritual community run by the Silver Sisterhood
 Brigid of Kildare, Saint Bride
 Morrice James, Baron Saint Brides